Ronald Ward (5 April 1901 – 31 March 1978) was a British actor who, alongside his stage work, appeared in more than twenty British films between 1931 and 1956. He was born in Eastbourne in 1901 as Ronald William Ward, and made his screen debut in the 1931 film Alibi. One of his biggest roles was in the popular Vera Lynn vehicle We'll Meet Again (1943), where he was effectively the male lead (although he was billed fourth), co-starring with Lynn and Patricia Roc.

His final marriage was to the actress Betty Baskcomb; and he was father of photographer Michael Ward.

Partial filmography

 Alibi (1931) - Ralph Ackroyd
 Love's Old Sweet Song (1933) - Eric Kingslake
 Brides to Be (1934) - George Hutton
 Girls Will Be Boys (1934) - Bernard
 The Broken Rosary (1934) - Jack
 The Passing of the Third Floor Back (1935) - Chris Penny
 The Man Behind the Mask (1936) - Jimmy Slade
 East Meets West (1936) - Neville Carter
 Strange Experiment (1937) - Michael Waring
 Splinters in the Air (1937) - Richards
 Stardust (1938) - Eric Williams
 Sidewalks of London (1938) - Jack Temperley
 Goodbye, Mr. Chips (1939) - (uncredited)
 The Proud Valley (1940) - Sir John (uncredited)
 Confidential Lady (1940) - John Canter
 Turned Out Nice Again (1941) - Nelson
 This England (1941) - Lord Clavely
 We'll Meet Again (1943) - Frank
 Escape to Danger (1943) - Rupert Chessman
 They Met in the Dark (1943) - Carter
 Carnival (1946) - Jack Danby
 Green for Danger (1946) - Minor Role (uncredited)
 My Daughter Joy (1950) - Dr. Schindler
 The Second Mrs. Tanqueray (1952) - Cayley Drummie
 The Straw Man (1953) - Clay Rushlow (scenes deleted)
 The Rainbow Jacket (1954) - Bernie Rudd
 Aunt Clara (1954) - Cyril Mason
 Lost (1956) - Military Man (uncredited) (final film role)

References

External links 
 

1901 births
1978 deaths
English male stage actors
English male film actors
20th-century English male actors